Dwayne Douglas Johnson (born May 2, 1972), also known by his ring name The Rock, is an American actor and former professional wrestler. Widely regarded as one of the greatest professional wrestlers of all time, he was integral to the development and success of the World Wrestling Federation (WWF, now WWE) during the Attitude Era, an industry boom period in the late 1990s and early 2000s. Johnson wrestled for the WWF for eight years prior to pursuing an acting career.

After accepting an athletic scholarship to play at the University of Miami, he was a member of the 1991 national championship team, but largely spent his four college football years in backup roles behind elite players, including future NFL player and Pro Football Hall of Fame inductee Warren Sapp. Johnson aspired to play professional football but went undrafted in the 1995 NFL Draft. Following his graduation, he signed with the Calgary Stampeders but was cut from the team in his first season. In 1996, Johnson's father Rocky, a longtime professional wrestler, assisted in helping him secure a contract with the WWF. Johnson quickly rose to global prominence, aided by a gimmick he employed as a charismatic trash talker. Johnson left WWE in 2004 and returned in 2011 as a part-time performer until 2013, making sporadic appearances until retiring in 2019. A 10-time world champion, including the promotion's first of African-American descent, he is also a two-time Intercontinental Champion, a five-time Tag Team Champion, the 2000 Royal Rumble winner, and WWE's sixth Triple Crown champion. Johnson headlined the most-bought professional wrestling pay-per-view (WrestleMania XXVIII) and was featured among the most watched episodes of WWE's flagship television series (Raw and SmackDown).

Johnson's first film appearance was in The Mummy Returns (2001). The following year he played his first leading role as the titular character in the sword and sorcery action fantasy film The Scorpion King (2002). He has since starred in family films The Game Plan (2007), Race to Witch Mountain (2009), Tooth Fairy (2010),  and Jungle Cruise (2021), as well as the action adventure films Journey 2: The Mysterious Island (2012), G.I. Joe: Retaliation (2013), Hercules (2014), Skyscraper (2018), San Andreas (2015) and Rampage (2018). He also starred in the action comedy films Get Smart (2008), Central Intelligence (2016), Baywatch (2017), and Red Notice (2021). In 2016 he voiced Maui in the Disney animated film Moana (2016). His role as Luke Hobbs in the Fast & Furious films, beginning with Fast Five (2011), and subsequently starred in the spin-off Hobbs & Shaw (2019). Johnson also stars in the Jumanji films, appearing in Jumanji: Welcome to the Jungle (2017) and Jumanji: The Next Level (2019), and voices Bark Kent / Krypto / Superdog, Anubis, and Teth-Adam / Black Adam in the animated film DC League of Super-Pets (2022), before starring as the latter in the live-action superhero film Black Adam (2022).

Johnson produced and starred in the HBO comedy-drama series Ballers (2015–2019), and the autobiographical sitcom Young Rock (2021). In 2000, Johnson released his autobiography, The Rock Says, which was a New York Times bestseller. In 2012, he co-founded the entertainment production company Seven Bucks Productions, and is co-owner of the XFL, a professional American football league. In 2016 and 2019, Time named Johnson one of the world's most influential people.

Early life 
Johnson was born in Hayward, California on May 2, 1972, the son of Ata Johnson (née Maivia; born 1948) and former professional wrestler Rocky Johnson (born Wayde Douglas Bowles; 1944–2020). Growing up, Johnson lived briefly in Grey Lynn in Auckland, New Zealand with his mother's family, where he played rugby and attended Richmond Road Primary School before returning to the U.S.

Johnson's father was a Black Nova Scotian with a small amount of Irish ancestry. His mother is Samoan. His father and Tony Atlas were the first black tag team champions in WWE history, in 1983. His mother is the adopted daughter of Peter Maivia, who was also a professional wrestler. Johnson's maternal grandmother Lia was one of the first female pro wrestling promoters, taking over Polynesian Pacific Pro Wrestling after her husband's death in 1982 and managing it until 1988. Through his maternal grandfather Maivia, Johnson is a non-blood relative to the Anoa'i wrestling family. In 2008, Johnson inducted his father and grandfather into the WWE Hall of Fame.

Johnson attended Montclaire Elementary School in Charlotte, North Carolina before moving to Hamden, Connecticut, where he attended Shepherd Glen Elementary School and then Hamden Middle School. Johnson attended President William McKinley High School in Honolulu and then Glencliff High School and McGavock High School, both in Nashville, and then Freedom High School in Bethlehem Township in the Lehigh Valley, where he graduated in 1990.

At Freedom High School in the Lehigh Valley, Johnson initially struggled and was drawn into a culture of conflict and petty crime. Before the age of 17, he was arrested multiple times for fighting, theft, and check fraud and was suspended two weeks for fighting. The local newspaper later described him as "a troubled teenager with a history of run-ins with police." Freedom High School football coach Jody Cwik, however, saw athletic potential in Johnson, and recruited him to join Freedom's football team, where he played defensive tackle. The experience proved the beginning of a personal transformation for Johnson. "My thought process started to change. That's when I started thinking about goals and what I wanted to accomplish," he has since said about his high school football experience.

In addition to playing football at Freedom High School, Johnson also was a member of the school's track and field and wrestling teams. Like the school's football team, its track and field and wrestling teams competed in the Eastern Pennsylvania Conference (EPC), a high school athletic conference known for being among the nation's best. The EPC's wrestling programs have been ranked best in the nation by WIN magazine and have been described as "among the nation's best in the sport for nearly three decades", and Johnson quickly found himself facing some of the nation's most accomplished high school wrestlers.

By his senior year at Freedom High School, Johnson had only played two years of high school football but the fact that he had excelled on a team in an elite high school athletic division known nationally for producing a long list of professional and Olympic-level athletes, including future NFL stars Andre Reed, Saquon Barkley, Kyzir White, and others, drew the attention of NCAA Division I collegiate programs. College football recruiters ranked Johnson as one of the top ten high school defensive tackles in the nation. He opted to accept a full athletic scholarship offer from the University of Miami, whose football program was then one of the best in the nation.

Football career

College career

As he did in high school in Pennsylvania, Johnson continued to play defensive tackle at the University of Miami. He was a member of the Miami Hurricanes football team during his freshman year in 1991, and won that year's national championship. Despite playing four years there, Johnson found himself behind elite players on the depth chart, including future NFL star and Pro Football Hall of Fame inductee Warren Sapp, and appeared mostly in backup roles.

In 1995, Johnson graduated with a Bachelor of General Studies and a dual major in criminology and physiology. Additionally, Johnson was one of the university's most prolific student speakers in the Miami-area community, frequently delivering positive messages about his own struggles and encouraging them to remain in school and avoid the dangers of drug use.

Canadian Football League
Following his graduation, Johnson was signed by the Calgary Stampeders of the Canadian Football League. Calgary moved Johnson from defensive tackle to the linebacker position. He was assigned to Calgary's practice roster, but was cut two months into Calgary's 1995 season.

Professional wrestling career

Early career (1996) 
After being cut by Calgary, Johnson began his professional wrestling career the following year, in 1996. Veteran wrestler Pat Patterson secured several tryout matches for Johnson with the World Wrestling Federation (WWF) in 1996. Wrestling at first under his real name, Johnson defeated The Brooklyn Brawler at a house show on March 10 and lost matches to Chris Candido and Owen Hart. After wrestling at Jerry Lawler's United States Wrestling Association under the name Flex Kavana and winning the USWA tag team championship twice with his partner Bart Sawyer in the summer of 1996, Johnson was signed to a WWF contract. He received additional training from Tom Prichard, alongside Achim Albrecht and Mark Henry.

World Wrestling Federation/Entertainment

Debut and Intercontinental Champion (1996–1997) 
Johnson made his WWF debut as Rocky Maivia, a combination of his father and grandfather's ring names, although his real name was acknowledged by the announcers. He was initially reluctant to take this ring name but was persuaded by Vince McMahon and Jim Ross. He was given the nickname "The Blue Chipper" and to play up his lineage, he was hyped as the WWF's first third-generation wrestler. Maivia, a clean-cut face character, was pushed heavily from the start despite his wrestling inexperience. He debuted on Monday Night Raw as a member of Marc Mero's entourage on November 4, 1996. His first match came at Survivor Series, on November 17, 1996, in an eight-man elimination tag match; he was the sole survivor and eliminated the final two members of the opposing team, Crush and Goldust. On February 13, 1997, he won the Intercontinental Championship from Hunter Hearst Helmsley on Monday Night Raw. Maivia then successfully defended the title against Helmsley at In Your House 13: Final Four.

Johnson's first WrestleMania match came at WrestleMania 13 on March 23, 1997, where he was victorious in his Intercontinental Championship defense against The Sultan. WWF fans started to reject his character and push from the company. He defeated Bret Hart by disqualification in a title defense on the March 31 episode of Raw is War. Behind the scenes, Hart mentored Johnson for his first year in WWF and refused to be booked to take the title from him. On April 20, at In Your House 14: Revenge of the 'Taker, he lost to Savio Vega by countout but retained the title. Audiences became increasingly hostile toward Maivia, with chants of "die, Rocky, die" and "Rocky sucks" being heard during his matches.

The Nation of Domination (1997–1998) 
After losing the Intercontinental Championship to Owen Hart on the April 28, 1997, episode of Raw Is War and suffering a legitimate knee injury in a match against Mankind, Maivia returned in August 1997 and turned heel for the first time in his career by lashing out at fans who had been booing him and joining Faarooq, D'Lo Brown and Kama in the stable called the Nation of Domination. He then refused to acknowledge the Rocky Maivia name, instead referring to himself in the third person as the Rock, though he would still be billed as "The Rock" Rocky Maivia until 1998. The Rock would then regularly insult the audience, WWF performers, and interviewers in his promos.

At D-Generation X: In Your House on December 7, 1997, Stone Cold Steve Austin defeated the Rock in under six minutes to retain the Intercontinental Championship. The next night on Raw Is War, Austin was ordered by Mr. McMahon to defend the title in a rematch, but forfeited it to the Rock instead, handing him the title belt before hitting him with the Stone Cold Stunner. The Rock feuded with Austin and Ken Shamrock through the end of 1997 and beginning of 1998. On January 19, 1998, at the Royal Rumble, the Rock defeated Shamrock by disqualification to retain the Intercontinental title. Later that night, he entered the Royal Rumble match and lasted until the final two before he was eliminated by Stone Cold Steve Austin. On March 29, at WrestleMania XIV, he defeated Shamrock by disqualification once again to retain the title. The next night, on Raw is War, the Rock debuted a new Intercontinental Championship design and would later overthrow Faarooq as leader of the Nation of Domination to spark a feud between the two. He then successfully defended the Intercontinental title against Faarooq at Over the Edge: In Your House on May 31. The stable would then refer to themselves as simply "The Nation".

The Rock and The Nation then feuded with Triple H and D-Generation X, with the two stable leaders first meeting in the quarter-final of the 1998 King of the Ring tournament, which the Rock won. At King of the Ring, the Rock defeated Dan Severn in the semi-final match and lost to rival Ken Shamrock in the final. The Rock then resumed his feud with Triple H, as the two had a two out of three falls match at Fully Loaded: In Your House for the Intercontinental title, which the Rock retained in controversial fashion. This led to a ladder match at SummerSlam on August 30, 1998, where the Rock lost the title.

In the latter half of 1998, The Rock saw a big uptick in fan support. He also started consolidating his famous persona during this time, which would last until 2000. His popularity caused him to be booked in a feud with fellow Nation members Mark Henry and D'Lo Brown, turning babyface in the process. Henry defeated him at Judgment Day: In Your House on October 18, 1998, after interference from Brown, effectively breaking up the stable.

WWF Champion and rise to superstardom (1998–2000) 

The Rock was then entered into the "Deadly Game" tournament for the vacant WWF Championship. The finals occurred at Survivor Series on November 15, 1998, where the Rock defeated Vince McMahon's associate, Mankind, to win his first WWF Championship. A "double turn" then occurred as the Rock turned heel again after allying with Vince and Shane McMahon as the crown jewel of their stable, The Corporation, after the McMahons betrayed Mankind. On December 13, 1998, at the pay-per-view named after him, Rock Bottom: In Your House, the Rock had a rematch with Mankind for the WWF Championship. Mankind appeared to win the match when the Rock passed out to the Mandible Claw submission move, but Vince McMahon ruled that since the Rock did not tap out, he retained his title.

In the main event of the January 4, 1999, episode of Raw Is War, Mankind defeated the Rock for the championship after interference from Stone Cold Steve Austin. Then at the Royal Rumble on January 24, 1999, the Rock regained the title in an "I Quit" match, a type of submission match that only ends if one of the combatants says "I quit" on a microphone. Intended to show a vicious streak in the Rock's character, the Rock hit Mankind in the head with a steel chair 11 times instead of the scripted five, five shots already being a risky amount (most wrestling matches in the Attitude Era involving steel chairs had at most 2 or 3 shots to the head). After the fifth shot, Mankind was still at ringside instead of being two-thirds up the entrance ramp where he was supposed to be, and after the eleventh shot which knocked a bloodied Mankind out, a recording of Mankind saying "I Quit" from an earlier interview was played over the public address system. On January 31, during an episode of Sunday Night Heat, the Rock and Mankind participated in an Empty Arena match, a match that took place in an arena with 22,000 empty seats where any part of the facility could be used to contest the match. After 20 minutes of chaotic brawling in the ring, the stands, a kitchen, the catering area, an office, the arena corridors and finally a basement loading area, Mankind pinned the Rock using a forklift truck to win the WWF title. This match was referred to as "Halftime Heat" as it was televised during halftime of that year's Super Bowl. The two faced off again, at St. Valentine's Day Massacre: In Your House on February 14, 1999, in a Last Man Standing match which ended in a draw, meaning Mankind retained the title. Their feud ended on the February 15 Raw Is War, when the Rock won his third WWF Championship in a Ladder Match after a debuting Big Show interfered on his behalf. The Rock then lost the WWF Championship to Stone Cold Steve Austin at WrestleMania XV on March 28, 1999.

The Rock's popularity continued to grow and audiences still cheered for him even though he was a heel. He then lost the title rematch against Stone Cold Steve Austin at Backlash: In Your House on April 25, 1999. The next night on Raw is War he was fired from the Corporation after he was betrayed by Shane McMahon, turning him face again and starting a feud with Triple H, The Undertaker and The Corporate Ministry. On April 29, 1999, WWF aired the pilot episode of SmackDown!, a term derived from one of the Rock's catchphrases. In the episode, the Rock continued his feud with The Corporate Ministry. This led to a match with Triple H, at Over the Edge on May 23, 1999, which the Rock won, and a match for the WWF Championship against The Undertaker, at King of the Ring, which the Rock lost. The Rock then lost a number one contender's match to Triple H, at Fully Loaded, after interference from "Mr. Ass" Billy Gunn. The Rock then defeated Gunn in a Kiss My Ass match at SummerSlam on August 22, 1999. The Rock was also given the privilege of having his own signature match, like The Undertaker with the Buried Alive match, Kane with the Inferno Match and Mankind with the Boiler Room Brawl: the Brahma Bullrope match, a variant of a strap match was a normal singles match where the components are tied together with a rope used for cattle farming, and the rope and its attached cowbell could both be used as weapons. The Rock contested this match twice, both times in Texas (vs Triple H in Dallas, and vs Al Snow in Houston).

Shortly after SummerSlam, the Rock began teaming with former opponent Mankind and the two became known as the Rock 'n' Sock Connection. They became WWF Tag Team Champions for the first time after defeating The Undertaker and Big Show for the titles on the August 30, 1999, episode of Raw is War. The two performed a number of critically acclaimed comedic skits together, including one called "This Is Your Life", which saw Mankind bring parody versions of people from the Rock's past on television, such as his high school girlfriend and his high school football coach, only to have the Rock insult them. The segment earned an 8.4 Nielsen rating, one of the highest ratings ever for a Raw segment. The two lost the titles back to Undertaker and Big Show on the September 9, 1999, episode of SmackDown! and won them back from them on the September 20, 1999, episode of Raw is War. Rock and Mankind then lost the titles to The New Age Outlaws on the very next episode of SmackDown!. Rock and Mankind would win the tag titles for the third and final time after beating the New Age Outlaws on the October 14, 1999, episode of SmackDown! before losing the titles to The Holly Cousins on the October 18, 1999, episode of Raw is War.

At the Royal Rumble, on January 23, 2000, the Rock entered the Royal Rumble match and was one of the final two remaining, along with Big Show. In an attempt at a "false finish", Big Show intended to throw the Rock over the top rope in a running powerslam-like position, before the Rock countered the move on the ring apron, sending Big Show to the floor before re-entering the ring as the winner. However, the Rock's feet accidentally hit the floor during the reversal attempt although those watching the event on television did not see that. This was played up in the storyline as Big Show provided additional video footage showing this fact, and claimed to be the rightful winner. The Rock's number one contendership for the WWF Championship was then put on the line against Big Show at No Way Out on February 27, 2000, which Big Show won after Shane McMahon interfered. The Rock then defeated Big Show, on the March 13 episode of Raw Is War, to regain the right to face the WWF Champion, Triple H, at WrestleMania 2000 on April 2, 2000, in a Fatal Four-way elimination match, also including Big Show and Mick Foley. Each wrestler had a McMahon in his corner: Triple H had his wife Stephanie, Foley had Linda, the Rock had Vince and Big Show had Shane. The Rock lasted until the final two but was eliminated by then-reigning champion Triple H after Vince betrayed him by hitting him with a chair.

Due to his image at the time, a Magic: The Gathering deck archetype was named after him.

Record-breaking world champion (2000–2002) 

In the following weeks, the Rock continued his feud with Triple H and eventually won his fourth WWF Championship, which he won on April 30, at Backlash, after Stone Cold Steve Austin intervened on his behalf. The following night on Raw, he successfully defended his title against Shane McMahon in a Steel Cage match. On May 21, at Judgment Day, the Rock faced Triple H in an Iron Man match with Shawn Michaels as the special guest referee. With the score tied at five falls each, and with seconds left on the time limit, the Rock was disqualified when The Undertaker attacked Triple H, thus giving Triple H the 6–5 win and the title. The Rock won the WWF Championship for a fifth time at King of the Ring on June 25 by scoring the winning pin in a six-man tag team match, teaming with Kane and The Undertaker against Shane McMahon, Triple H and Vince McMahon, whom he pinned. The Rock successfully defended the championship against Chris Benoit, on July 23, at Fully Loaded. The next month, he successfully defended his title against Kurt Angle and Triple H at SummerSlam. The Rock had another successful title defense against Benoit, Kane and The Undertaker, on September 24, at Unforgiven.

The Rock then lost the WWF Championship to Kurt Angle, at No Mercy, on October 22, 2000. The next month, the Rock feuded with Rikishi and defeated him at Survivor Series. The Rock wrestled a six-man Hell in a Cell match for the WWF Championship, at Armageddon, which Angle won to retain the title. On the December 18 episode of Raw, the Rock won the WWF Tag Team Championship with The Undertaker, defeating Edge and Christian, before losing it back to them the next night at a SmackDown! taping. In 2001, the Rock continued to feud with Angle over the WWF Championship, culminating at No Way Out on February 25, 2001, where he pinned Angle to win the WWF Championship for a sixth time. The Rock then feuded with the Royal Rumble winner, Stone Cold Steve Austin, whom he lost the title to at WrestleMania X-Seven after Austin allied with Vince McMahon, who interfered on his behalf. On the next night's Raw Is War, during a steel cage title rematch, Triple H attacked the Rock, allying with McMahon and Austin and helping Austin retain the championship. Austin and Triple H then formed a tag team called The Power Trip, while the Rock was indefinitely suspended in storyline. Johnson used this time off to act in The Scorpion King.

The Rock returned in late July 2001 when the WWF was feuding with rival promotions World Championship Wrestling (WCW) and Extreme Championship Wrestling (ECW) during what is known as The Invasion storyline. In reality, WCW was purchased by Vince McMahon and the WWF, and ECW had gone out of business in early 2001. Many former WCW and ECW wrestlers were then brought onto WWF television and formed The Alliance to compete with WWF in storyline. The Alliance and Vince McMahon then both attempted to persuade the Rock to join their team. The Rock then aligned with McMahon and the WWF. The next month, the Rock defeated Booker T, at SummerSlam, to win the WCW Championship for the first time. He later lost the title to Chris Jericho at No Mercy on October 21, 2001. The next night on Raw, he teamed with Jericho to win the WWF Tag Team Championship from The Dudley Boyz. The two then lost the tag titles to Booker T and Test on the November 1, 2001, episode of SmackDown!. The Rock defeated Jericho on the November 5 episode of Raw for his second WCW Championship.

As part of the WWF's battle against The Alliance, the Rock wrestled in a "winner takes all" five-on-five elimination tag team match at Survivor Series where the losing team's company would be dissolved in storyline. He was a member of Team WWF along with Chris Jericho, The Undertaker, Kane, and Big Show. The Alliance's team consisted of Stone Cold Steve Austin, Kurt Angle, Booker T, Rob Van Dam, and Shane McMahon. In the end, it came down to a one-on-one between the Rock and Stone Cold Steve Austin. The Rock seemed to have the upper hand, until his teammate Jericho entered the ring and attacked the Rock. Austin tried to capitalize on this by pinning the Rock, but Kurt Angle revealed his true allegiance by attacking Austin. The Rock then pinned Austin, giving Team WWF the victory and forcing The Alliance to disband. The Rock's WCW Championship was renamed the unbranded "World Championship" following the Alliance's loss. At the next pay-per-view, Vengeance on December 9, 2001, the Rock lost the World Championship to Jericho, who would then unify the WWF and World titles later that night. The Rock then unsuccessfully challenged Jericho for the now Undisputed WWF Championship at Royal Rumble on January 20, 2002.

At the next pay-per-view, No Way Out on February 17, 2002, the Rock defeated The Undertaker in a singles match. The event also saw the WWF debut of the famed WCW faction New World Order, which at the time consisted of "Hollywood" Hulk Hogan, Kevin Nash, and Scott Hall. This later led to a match between the Rock and Hogan at WrestleMania X8 on March 17, 2002. The match was billed as "icon versus icon", with both men representing the top tier of two generations of wrestling; ultimately the Rock pinned Hogan at WrestleMania X8 to win the match. Despite the Rock portraying a heroic character and Hogan a villain, a portion of the crowd attending the SkyDome was rooting heavily for Hogan. In an interview in 2013, Hogan said he and the Rock changed the style of the match on the fly based on the crowd's response. After the introduction of the first-ever brand extension, the WWF held a "draft lottery" on the March 25, 2002, episode of Raw. The Rock was the number one overall pick, going to the SmackDown! brand before taking a sabbatical from wrestling.

The Rock made a surprise return on a June episode of Raw before going to his assigned brand of SmackDown!. There, he was named the number one contender for the WWE Undisputed Championship, which he won for a record-setting seventh time at Vengeance, on July 21, by defeating Kurt Angle and then-champion The Undertaker in a Triple Threat match. The Rock successfully defended the title at the Global Warning event against Triple H and Brock Lesnar after pinning Triple H. On August 25, at SummerSlam, after interference from Lesnar's manager Paul Heyman, the Rock lost the WWE Undisputed Championship to Lesnar along with the record for the youngest WWE Champion, which he had set in 1998. In 2018, writing for ESPN.com, Sean Coyle noted in a retrospective review of the event, that following his victory over Hulk Hogan at WrestleMania X8, the Rock "started to see a dip in fan support" and "that dip turned into a plunge" by the time Rock had his match with Lesnar at SummerSlam because fans knew he was leaving WWE to pursue an acting career. This was evident by the fact that he was met with a negative crowd response during his match against Lesnar. After SummerSlam ended, the Rock was visibly angry at the crowd reaction. When he tried to do a post-show speech for the crowd, the fans at Nassau Coliseum still booed him. The Rock then took time off to kickstart his acting career.

Final feuds and departure (2003–2004) 
The Rock returned on the January 30, 2003, episode of SmackDown! to set up another match with Hulk Hogan at No Way Out. Because of negative fan reaction during his previous couple of matches as a result of his budding acting career, The Rock turned heel for the first time since 1999. He also started a new persona that has been called Hollywood Rock, with a new look and a shaved head. The Rock defeated Hogan at No Way Out before moving to the Raw brand. There, he had various small feuds, including one with The Hurricane. He also began performing "Rock Concerts", segments in which he played the guitar and mocked WWE performers and fans in song.

After failing to win a number one contendership for the World Heavyweight Championship, The Rock went into another program with Stone Cold Steve Austin. This led to a match at WrestleMania XIX on March 30, 2003, which called back to their previous two WrestleMania encounters, both of which Austin had won. The Rock won after delivering three consecutive Rock Bottoms, ending their long-running rivalry in what turned out to be Austin's final match. The next night, Raw was billed as "The Rock Appreciation Night", in honor of his victory over Austin. That night, he was attacked by a debuting Goldberg. At Backlash on April 27, 2003, Goldberg defeated The Rock, who then briefly left WWE to film Walking Tall.

Throughout the rest of the year, The Rock made occasional appearances, returning to a face character. In 2004, The Rock aided Mick Foley in his feud against Evolution, leading to a reunion of the Rock 'n' Sock Connection. They lost against Ric Flair, Randy Orton, and Batista in a handicap match at WrestleMania XX on March 14, 2004, when Orton pinned Foley after an RKO. This would be Johnson's final wrestling match until November 2011. The Rock appeared in WWE sporadically following WrestleMania XX. He made returns to provide support for Eugene against Jonathan Coachman, and made a cameo in his hometown of Miami and helped Mick Foley against La Résistance. Later in 2004, he hosted a pie-eating contest, as part of the WWE Diva Search, and ended the segment by giving Coachman a People's Elbow. The Rock's contract with WWE then ended and he started his full-time acting career.

Non-wrestling appearances (2007–2009) 
On March 12, 2007, the Rock appeared on a WWE show after nearly three years, via a pre-taped promo shown during Raw. He correctly predicted that Bobby Lashley would defeat Umaga at WrestleMania 23 in Donald Trump and Vince McMahon's "Battle of the Billionaires" Hair vs Hair match. On March 29, 2008, Johnson appeared to induct his father Rocky Johnson and grandfather Peter Maivia into the WWE Hall of Fame. Johnson's next appearance was through a pre-taped promo on October 2, 2009, during the Decade of SmackDown.

Independent circuit (2009)
On September 30, 2009, the Rock appeared at a World Xtreme Wrestling (WXW) show to support the professional wrestling debut of Sarona Snuka, the daughter of his long-time friend and mentor Jimmy Snuka.

Return to WWE

Feud with John Cena (2011–2013) 

On February 14, 2011, the Rock was announced as the host of WrestleMania XXVII on April 3, 2011, appearing live on Raw for the first time in almost seven years. During a lengthy promo, he addressed the fans and started a feud with John Cena. After numerous appearances via satellite, the Rock appeared live on the Raw before WrestleMania XXVII to confront Cena. After he and Cena exchanged insults, The Miz and Alex Riley appeared and attacked the Rock; he fended off Miz and Riley, only for Cena to blindside him with an Attitude Adjustment.

On April 3, at WrestleMania XXVII, the Rock opened the show by cutting a promo. After appearing in numerous backstage segments, the Rock came to ringside to restart the main event between Cena and The Miz as a No Disqualification match, after it had ended in a draw. As revenge for the Attitude Adjustment Cena had given him on Raw, Rock hit Cena with the Rock Bottom, allowing The Miz to pin him and retain the WWE Championship. After the match, Rock attacked Miz and hit him with the People's Elbow. The following night on Raw, the Rock and Cena agreed to a match at WrestleMania XXVIII the next year. They then worked together to fend off an attack by The Corre, which at the time consisted of Wade Barrett, Heath Slater, Justin Gabriel, and Ezekiel Jackson.

The Rock appeared live on Raw in his hometown of Miami to celebrate his 39th birthday. On September 16, WWE announced the Rock would wrestle in a traditional 5-on-5 Survivor Series tag team match, teaming with Cena at Survivor Series in November. However, on the October 24 episode of Raw, Cena instead suggested the Rock be his partner in a standard tag team match against The Miz and R-Truth, a team called Awesome Truth, which Rock agreed to the following week. On November 14, during the special Raw Gets Rocked, the Rock appeared live, delivering Rock Bottoms to Mick Foley, who had been hosting a "This Is Your Life"-style segment for Cena, and later both members of Awesome Truth. The Rock and Cena defeated Awesome Truth on November 20 at Survivor Series, when the Rock pinned The Miz. After the match, the Rock gave Cena a Rock Bottom.

Leading up to WrestleMania, the Rock and Cena had several verbal confrontations on Raw. On the March 12, 2012, episode of Raw, the Rock hosted his first "Rock Concert" segment since 2004, mocking Cena in his songs. On April 1, at WrestleMania XXVIII, the Rock beat Cena in the main event after countering Cena's attempt at a People's Elbow into a Rock Bottom. This event broke the record for biggest professional wrestling pay-per-view buyrate. The following night on Raw, the Rock praised Cena, calling their match "an honor". He then vowed to once again become WWE Champion.

On July 23, at Raw 1000, the Rock announced he would wrestle for the WWE Championship at the Royal Rumble pay-per-view. During the show, he encountered then-reigning WWE Champion CM Punk, Daniel Bryan, and John Cena, all of whom expressed a desire to face him. The Rock later saved Cena from an assault by Big Show, only to be laid out by CM Punk. On the January 7, 2013, episode of Raw, the Rock returned to confront his Royal Rumble opponent CM Punk. On January 11, he made his first SmackDown appearance in ten years, getting into an altercation with Team Rhodes Scholars, resulting in him delivering a Rock Bottom to Damien Sandow and a People's Elbow to Cody Rhodes. The Rock closed out the 20th-anniversary episode of Raw, on January 14, with one of his "Rock Concerts", leading to a brawl with CM Punk. The following week on Raw, the Rock was attacked by The Shield. Vince McMahon then asserted that if The Shield attacked the Rock in his title match with CM Punk, Punk would be stripped of the WWE Championship.

On January 27, at the Royal Rumble, CM Punk would seemingly defeat the Rock after the arena lights went out and someone attacked the Rock. Vince McMahon then came out and was about to strip Punk of the championship, however, at the Rock's request, he instead restarted the match. This culminated in the Rock defeating Punk to win his eighth WWE Championship. Punk received a title rematch with the Rock, at Elimination Chamber on February 17, 2013, with the added stipulation that if the Rock was disqualified or counted out, he would still lose the WWE Championship. The Rock would pin Punk to retain the championship. The following night on Raw, the Rock unveiled a new WWE Championship design, with a different center plate and removable customizable side-plates which had his "Brahma Bull" logo. The Rock then resumed his rivalry with John Cena, who won that year's Royal Rumble to set up a rematch of the previous WrestleMania match between the two at WrestleMania 29, only this time with the WWE Championship on the line.

On April 7, at WrestleMania 29, Rock lost the WWE Championship to Cena, ending his reign at 70 days. Despite being advertised for Raw after WrestleMania, where it was stated that the Rock was still entitled a rematch for the WWE Championship, The Rock did not appear because of a legitimate injury sustained during his match with Cena, in which his abdominal and adductor tendons tore from his pelvis. Johnson underwent surgery on April 23 to reattach the torn tendons.

Sporadic appearances (2014–2019) 

In April 2014, the Rock appeared in the opening segment of WrestleMania XXX along with Stone Cold Steve Austin and Hulk Hogan. On the October 6 episode of Raw, the Rock made a surprise appearance to confront Rusev and Lana; this resulted in the Rock clearing Rusev from the ring.

The Rock appeared at the 2015 Royal Rumble event on January 25, 2015, during the main event match, where he helped his relative Roman Reigns fend off Big Show and Kane after Reigns eliminated them from the match. Reigns then won the match and the Rock endorsed him in the ring. The Rock appeared at WrestleMania 31 on March 29, 2015, alongside Ronda Rousey, getting into an in-ring altercation with Triple H and Stephanie McMahon. Rock and Rousey prevailed after he attacked Triple H and she overpowered McMahon. On June 27, the Rock appeared at a live event in Boston, where he confronted Bo Dallas and gave him a Rock Bottom.

On the January 25, 2016, episode of Raw, the Rock was in a segment that saw him converse with The Miz, Big Show, Lana and Rusev before he and his relatives, The Usos, got into an altercation with then-WWE Tag Team Champions, The New Day. The Rock appeared at WrestleMania 32 on April 3, 2016, where he announced that WWE had broken the all-time WrestleMania attendance record before being interrupted by The Wyatt Family. The Rock got into a verbal back-and-forth with Bray Wyatt before having an impromptu match with Wyatt Family member Erick Rowan. The Rock won after giving Rowan a Rock Bottom and pinning him in six seconds, which set the record for the fastest win in WrestleMania history. The Rock was then aided by a returning John Cena to fend off Wyatt, Rowan and Braun Strowman. On the February 20, 2017, episode of Raw, the Rock made an untelevised appearance after the broadcast had gone off the air, where he promoted and filmed a scene for his then-upcoming film Fighting with My Family.

On August 3, 2019, the Rock officially announced his retirement from professional wrestling. On September 30, 2019, after weeks of speculation, the Rock announced that he would be making an appearance on SmackDowns 20th Anniversary on October 4, 2019, marking his first appearance on SmackDown since October 2014 and his first televised appearance since April 2016. At the event, he would cut a promo with Becky Lynch before they were interrupted by King Corbin. After attacking Corbin, the Rock and Lynch celebrated in the ring.

Impact Wrestling (2020) 
The Rock made an appearance at Impact Wrestling's 2020 Bound for Glory on October 20, 2020, in Nashville via a recorded video message to induct Ken Shamrock into the Impact Hall of Fame.

Mainstream crossover 

The Rock appeared on Wyclef Jean's 2000 single "It Doesn't Matter" and in its music video. He also recorded "Pie" with Slick Rick for WWF The Music, Vol. 5.

In 1999, Johnson appeared on That '70s Show as his father Rocky Johnson. The next year, he was on Star Trek: Voyager as an alien wrestler that used the Rock's famous moves.

In 2000, he hosted Saturday Night Live (SNL) for the first time. Fellow wrestlers Triple H, Big Show, and Mick Foley also appeared on the show. Johnson has stated the success of that episode is the reason he began receiving offers from Hollywood studios. He has since hosted SNL another four times.

In 1999, the Rock was listed No. 5 on Entertainment Weeklys Top 12 Entertainers of the Year. In 2000, Access Hollywood ranked him number six in their list of the Top 10 Celebrities of 2000. That year, Rock was also listed in the Forbes Celebrity 100 and People Magazine's 25 Most Intriguing People.

The Rock was listed on Entertainment Weeklys 101 Most Influential People in both 2000 and 2001. In 2001, he was also listed on E!'s 20 Top Entertainers. In 2002, the Rock was listed on E!'s 25 Toughest Stars. In 2003, he was listed in VH1's 200 Greatest Pop Culture Icons and was No. 13 in People Magazine's 50 Favorite TV Stars.

The Rock made a surprise appearance at the official Xbox unveiling during Bill Gates's keynote speech at the ongoing Computer Electronics Show in 2001.

Johnson's motion picture debut was as The Scorpion King in The Mummy Returns (2001). The movie broke a two-year record for the highest-grossing single day in film history by earning US$28,594,667. The movie's financial success led to Johnson's first leading role in the spin-off The Scorpion King (2002). He received US$5.5 million for the role and Guinness World Records named him the record-holder for highest-paid actor in their first leading role.

The Rock has appeared on the covers of many magazines, including Rolling Stone, Entertainment Weekly, and TV Guide. He has also appeared in, and been the cover athlete for, several video games.

, his Instagram account is the fourth most-followed in the world with over 280 million followers.

Legacy and career assessment 

The Rock has been listed as one of the all-time greatest professional wrestlers as well as one of the top draws in wrestling history. Many have placed the Rock on their "Mount Rushmore of Pro Wrestling", including Hulk Hogan, Ric Flair and John Cena. In "Cable Visions: Television Beyond Broadcasting", the Rock was described as "for a long time, the WWE's biggest star and probably held the greatest international appeal". R. D. Reynolds stated in his book "The WrestleCrap Book of Lists" that the Rock was "the biggest star for WWE from 1999 until 2004".

The Rock main-evented the most bought pay-per-view worldwide in WWE history (WrestleMania XXVIII), the most bought pay-per-view domestically in WWE history (WrestleMania X-Seven), the highest rated Raw in history, the highest rated SmackDown in history, and was part of the highest rated cable segment in WWE history with Mankind entitled "This is Your Life", in which Mankind would honor The Rock with various gifts and reunions. His return in 2001 did a 7.1 rating which was the highest rated segment of the entire year. The Rock was also part of the highest rated match of the 21st century with his WWF Championship defense, on May 1, 2000, against Shane McMahon did an 8.3 rating making it the highest rated segment of all time behind 'This is your life'.

In 2011, the Rock's return to an episode of Raw generated an average of 4.7 million viewers in the United States, with 7.4 million tuning in during his promo. Raw 1000 was the highest rated Raw episode of 2012 and his segment with CM Punk and Daniel Bryan was the highest rated segment of the show. In 2013, the night after the Rock won the WWE Championship for the first time in over a decade, at Royal Rumble, Raw got its highest rating of that year.

Derived from one of his catchphrases "lay the smackdown", WWE introduced its second flagship program WWE SmackDown in 1999 which later became television's second longest-running weekly episodic program in history. The term "smackdown" was instituted in Merriam-Webster dictionaries since 2007. He is also known for popularizing the term "jabroni", derived from "jobber", although it was originally introduced by The Iron Sheik.

The Rock holds the record for most Raw shows main-evented in one year (38 in 2000), most SmackDown shows main-evented in one year (36 in 2000) and tied with Stone Cold Steve Austin (in 2001) for most PPV shows main evented in one year (12 in 2000).

At the 2021 Survivor Series, WWE held a 25-man Battle Royal to celebrate the 25th Anniversary of The Rock's WWE debut.  The match was won by Omos.

Acting career

Early years 
Johnson entered Hollywood and the film industry, becoming a star initially through his wrestling popularity and noted work ethic. Over his acting career, he became one of the highest paid and most successful actors in Hollywood. He began his acting career on television while wrestling. In his first television acting job, in 1999, he played his own father in an episode of That '70s Show called "That Wrestling Show". Nearly a year later, he appeared in the Star Trek: Voyager episode "Tsunkatse" as an alien wrestler who fought popular character Seven of Nine. While Johnson was away from WWE, the company continued to sell "The Rock" merchandise, and he continued to be featured prominently in the opening montages of their television shows.

Johnson began his theatrical career in The Mummy Returns (2001), The Scorpion King (2002), The Rundown (2003), and Walking Tall (2004). He played a supporting role in Be Cool (2005) - most notable for the meta element of playing a bodyguard that wants to become an actor - and was the primary antagonist in Doom (2005). He also had roles in Gridiron Gang (2006), Reno 911!: Miami (2007), and Southland Tales (2006). He played a cocky famous American football player in The Game Plan (2007) and Agent 23 in Get Smart (2008). He presented the Academy Award for Best Visual Effects at the 80th Academy Awards.

2010s and mainstream success 
Johnson's first big box office success came in 2011, portraying Luke Hobbs in Fast Five (2011), the film became the seventh highest-grossing film of 2011. He became known for reinvigorating film franchises after portraying Marvin F. Hinton / Roadblock in G.I. Joe: Retaliation and reprising his role as Luke Hobbs in Fast & Furious 6 (2013), while also starring in true-story films Pain & Gain (2013) and Empire State (2013). That same year, he hosted and produced the TNT reality competition series The Hero, and won the Favorite Male Buttkicker Award at the 2013 Nickelodeon Kid's Choice Awards. In May 2013, it was announced that he would executive produce and star in Ballers, an HBO comedy-drama series about NFL players living in Miami. By December of that year, Forbes named him the top-grossing actor of 2013, with his films bringing in $1.3 billion worldwide for the year. Forbes credited the success of Fast & Furious 6, which grossed $789 million globally, and his frequent acting work as primary reasons for topping the list.

Johnson starred as the title character in Hercules (2014) and reprised his role as Luke Hobbs in Furious 7 (2015). He hosted another reality series for TNT in 2014, entitled Wake Up Call, which saw him "lending a helping hand to everyday people who were facing enormous challenges in their lives" alongside guest experts such as Rocco DiSpirito, Jillian Michaels, and Josh Shipp. In 2016, Johnson co-starred with Kevin Hart in the action-comedy Central Intelligence and had a lead voice role in the Disney animated film Moana, in which he voiced the Polynesian demigod Maui. He reprised his role as Luke Hobbs in The Fate of the Furious, which was released in 2017. Johnson starred in two other blockbuster movies that year, Baywatch and Jumanji: Welcome to the Jungle as Mitchell "Mitch" Buchannon and Dr. Smolder Bravestone, respectively. In 2018, he starred in the action films Rampage and Skyscraper.

Johnson's role within The Fast and the Furious franchise continued with Hobbs & Shaw, co-starring Johnson and Jason Statham. David Leitch directed the project from a script co-written by franchise-writer Chris Morgan and Drew Pearce. The film began principal photography in September 2018, and was released on July 26, 2019. Though initially believed to be a part of F9, Johnson did not appear in the film; instead, he opted to begin development on a sequel to Hobbs & Shaw. Johnson reprised his role as Bravestone, in Jumanji: The Next Level. With the critical and financial success of Welcome to the Jungle, production of the movie began in early 2019, and was released on December 13, 2019.

In 2021, Johnson co-starred with Emily Blunt in The Walt Disney Company's Jungle Cruise, as Frank Wolff and Lily Houghton, respectively. Cast in the role in August 2015, the film was based on the theme-park ride of the same name. Jaume Collet-Serra served as director, with a script by Michael Green from a previous one co-written by J. D. Payne and Patrick McKay. In addition to his work on the film, Johnson assisted with re-designing the titular ride for all Disney theme parks. Jungle Cruise was released on July 30, 2021. Also in 2021, Johnson starred in Netflix's film Red Notice, written and directed by Rawson Marshall Thurber. It is the third time that the two collaborated, following Central Intelligence and Skyscraper. The film, co-starring Gal Gadot and Ryan Reynolds, began production in the fall of 2019.

Johnson is noted for his busy schedule and developing multiple projects at once. A sequel to the box-office hit San Andreas was announced to be in the pre-production stage with the director of the first film, Brad Peyton, returning as director along with the main cast (marking the fourth collaboration between the two following Journey 2, San Andreas, and Rampage).

On November 14, 2019, he announced a December 2021 release date for the standalone Black Adam film. Production on Black Adam began filming in April 2021 with it set to release on October 21, 2022. He earned $22.5 million to star in the film and received millions more for producing and promoting it on social media.

Johnson has been a member of the Academy of Motion Picture Arts and Sciences in the Actor's Branch since 2017.

On March 16, 2021, he appeared for the first time as The Foundation in Fortnite Battle Royale. Johnson was initially uncredited in his role, yet teased his involvement in a cryptic Instagram post shared on the day of the event. Following another Instagram video for Johnson's ZOA Energy drink, in which The Foundation's helmet and sidearm were subtly featured in the background, his involvement was finally confirmed during the Chapter 2 End Event on December 4, 2021, with The Foundation removing his helmet to reveal that he shared Johnson's voice and likeness.

Producer 
In 2012, Johnson founded his production company Seven Bucks Productions.

Though originally attached as producer and star, Johnson will now serve solely as the former on a film adaptation of The Janson Directive. John Cena will fill the leading role, with Akiva Goldsman attached as screenwriter. Additionally, he will produce and star in a Netflix exclusive film titled John Henry & The Statesmen, as the titular folklore hero. The film will be directed by Jake Kasdan, from a script co-written by Kasdan and Tom Wheeler. With the first official teaser trailer released in October 2018, the project marks Kasdan and Johnson's third collaboration, following Jumanji: Welcome to the Jungle and Jumanji: The Next Level.

In 2019, Johnson produced and appeared as himself in Fighting with My Family, a comedy drama about Paige and her family, who are also professional wrestlers.

Johnson will co-produce and star in The King, a film about king Kamehameha Kūnuiākea, founder and first ruler of the Kingdom of Hawaiʻi. The project will be directed by Robert Zemeckis from a script written by Randall Wallace. The movie will be comparable to Braveheart in tone, given Wallace's work on both films, and will depict the king's role in resolving the wars among the islands of Hawaiʻi. The King was scheduled to begin production in 2020, but was halted by the COVID-19 pandemic. Johnson is also attached to produce/star in a sequel to Big Trouble in Little China, as well as project under development with Shane Black focusing on a new interpretation of Doc Savage.

In 2021, his biographical comedy-drama series Young Rock began airing on NBC.

A film centered around Teth-Adam/Black Adam, a part of the DC Extended Universe, was announced to be in development in January 2017. Originally cast in the role as early as September 2014 as the antagonist, in a film centered around the superhero Billy Batson/Shazam, his villainous role for Shazam! was re-worked into two separate films. Though Johnson would not appear in Shazam!, he served as a producer and his likeness was used through special effects in flashback scenes.

Other work 
In 2000, Johnson published his autobiography, titled The Rock Says..., which he co-wrote with Joe Layden. It debuted at No. 1 on The New York Times Best Seller list and remained on the list for several weeks.

In 2013, Johnson hosted and produced the TNT reality competition series The Hero. In 2014, he hosted another TNT reality series entitled Wake Up Call. In 2019, Johnson started hosting an NBC competition series called The Titan Games.

In March 2016, Johnson partnered with American fitness apparel manufacturer Under Armour to release "Project Rock". The first item in his partnership with Under Armour, a gym bag, sold out in a couple of days. His second item, a black T-shirt sporting his signature "Brahma bull", sold out after being worn at WrestleMania 32. Johnson also released an alarm clock app as part of "Project Rock" that received more than one million downloads in its first week of release. Since then, they have released sneakers, headphones, and other apparel.

In 2016, Johnson started his YouTube channel. His first video, The YouTube Factory, featured online personality Lilly Singh and several other internet stars.

In 2019, Johnson announced he would be launching his own competitive bodybuilding show alongside his business partner and ex-wife Dany Garcia, called Athleticon. It is set to rival other long-standing bodybuilding shows such as The Arnold Classic and Joe Weider's Mr. Olympia. The show was set to debut in October 2020 in Atlanta, Georgia, but plans were disrupted by the COVID-19 pandemic.

In March 2020, Johnson launched Teremana Tequila which sold 600,000 nine-litre cases in its first year.

Johnson, who is a fan of the rapper Tech N9ne, featured on a song titled "Face Off" on the rapper's 2021 album Asin9ne.

Activism and philanthropy
Johnson attended the 2000 Democratic National Convention as part of WWE's non-partisan "Smackdown Your Vote" campaign, which aimed to influence young people to vote. He also had a speaking role at the 2000 Republican National Convention that same year.

Johnson voted for Barack Obama in the 2008 and 2012 presidential elections. He did not vote in the 2016 election, and is an independent voter . He endorsed Joe Biden in the 2020 presidential election. Johnson has expressed an interest in running for president himself, telling USA Today in February 2021 "I would consider a presidential run in the future if that's what the people wanted". Following an online public opinion poll that found that 46% of Americans would consider voting for Johnson in a presidential election, he further stated during an April 12, 2021, interview on The Today Show that "I do have that goal to unite our country and I also feel that if this is what the people want, then I will do that".

In 2006, Johnson founded the Dwayne Johnson Rock Foundation, a charity working with at-risk and terminally ill children. On October 2, 2007, he and his then wife, Dany Garcia, donated $1 million to the University of Miami to support the renovation of its football facilities. The University of Miami renamed the Hurricanes' locker room in Johnson's honor. In 2015, Johnson donated $1,500 to a GoFundMe to pay for an abandoned dog's surgery. In 2017, he donated $25,000 to Hurricane Harvey relief efforts. In 2018, Johnson donated a gym to a military base in Oahu, Hawaii. After the 2018 Hawaii floods, he worked with Malama Kauai, a nonprofit organization, to help repair damages caused by the floods. Johnson has also worked with Make-A-Wish Foundation on a number of occasions.

Personal life
Johnson first met fellow University of Miami student Dany Garcia in the early 1990s. The couple married on May 3, 1997. She is a businesswoman, IFBB professional bodybuilder, and producer. Their daughter, Simone, was born on August 14, 2001. On June 1, 2007, Johnson and Garcia announced they were separating amicably, and their divorce was finalized in May 2008.

In 2007, Johnson began dating Lauren Hashian, the daughter of Boston drummer Sib Hashian. They first met in 2006 while Johnson was filming The Game Plan. They were married on August 18, 2019, in Hawaii. They have two daughters: Jasmine (born December 17, 2015) and Tiana (born April 17, 2018). Johnson and Hashian live in Los Angeles, have a farm in Virginia, and a home in Southwest Ranches, Florida.

In recognition of his service to the Samoan people, and because he is a descendant of Samoan chiefs, Johnson was given the noble title of Seiuli (meaning the son of Malietoa [Alo o Malietoa]) by Malietoa Tanumafili II during his visit there on August 9, 2004. In 2009, he gained Canadian citizenship through his father's birth and citizenship there.

He got a partial Samoan pe'a tattoo on his left side in 2003. In 2017, he had the small "Brahma bull" tattoo on his right arm covered with a larger half-sleeve tattoo of a bull's skull.

In February 2020, WWE announced that Johnson's daughter Simone began training at the WWE Performance Center, making her the first fourth-generation WWE wrestler. On May 16, Johnson announced she had signed a contract with WWE, and in May 2022 announced that her ring name would be Ava Raine, and has since been appearing on the NXT brand.

Discography

Singles

As lead artist

As featured artist

Filmography

Championships and accomplishments 

 Pro Wrestling Illustrated
 Match of the Year (1999) 
 Match of the Year (2002) 
 Most Popular Wrestler of the Year (1999, 2000)
 Wrestler of the Year (2000)
 Ranked No. 2 of the top 500 singles wrestlers in the PWI 500 in 2000
 United States Wrestling Association
 USWA World Tag Team Championship (2 times) – with Bart Sawyer
 Wrestling Observer Newsletter
 Best Box Office Draw (2000, 2011, 2012)
 Best Gimmick (1999)
 Best on Interviews (1999, 2000)
 Most Charismatic (1999–2002, 2011, 2012)
 Most Improved (1998)
 Wrestling Observer Newsletter Hall of Fame (Class of 2007)
 WWE/World Wrestling Entertainment/Federation
 WWE Championship (8 times)
 WCW Championship (2 times)
 WWF Intercontinental Championship (2 times)
 WWF Tag Team Championship (5 times) – with Mankind (3), The Undertaker (1), and Chris Jericho (1)
 Royal Rumble (2000)
 Sixth Triple Crown Champion
 Deadly Games WWF Championship Tournament (1998)
 Slammy Award (9 times)
 Best Actor (2014)
 Game Changer of the Year (2011) – with John Cena
 Guess Who's Back or: Return of the Year (2011)
 LOL! Moment of the Year (2012, 2013) – , 
 Match of the Year (2013) – 
 New Sensation (1997)
 "Tell Me You Didn't Just Say That" Insult of the Year (2014) – 
 "This is Awesome" Moment of the Year (2015) – with Ronda Rousey

Awards and honors

Notes

References

External links 

 
 
 
 Dwayne Johnson profile at Miami Hurricanes football

 
1972 births
Living people
20th-century American male actors
21st-century American male actors
Actors of Samoan descent
African-American film producers
African-American male actors
African-American male professional wrestlers
African-American players of American football
African-American players of Canadian football
African-American television producers
American emigrants to New Zealand
American expatriates in New Zealand
American film producers
American football defensive tackles
American male film actors
American male professional wrestlers
American male television actors
American male voice actors
American people of Black Nova Scotian descent
American people of Canadian descent
American people of Irish descent
American people of Samoan descent
American philanthropists
American professional wrestlers of Samoan descent
American sportspeople of Samoan descent
Anoa'i family
Calgary Stampeders players
Canadian football defensive linemen
Film producers from California
Freedom High School (Pennsylvania) alumni
Illeists
Male actors from California
Male actors from the San Francisco Bay Area
Miami Hurricanes football players
People from Southwest Ranches, Florida
Players of American football from California
Players of American football from Pennsylvania
Professional wrestlers from California
Professional wrestlers from Florida
Shorty Award winners
Sportspeople from Bethlehem, Pennsylvania
Sportspeople from Hayward, California
Sportspeople from the San Francisco Bay Area
Television producers from California
The Nation of Domination members
USWA World Tag Team Champions
WCW World Heavyweight Champions
WWE Champions
WWF/WWE Intercontinental Champions
XFL (2020) owners
YouTube channels launched in 2005